Empire Frost was a  cargo ship which was built in 1940 by Lithgows, Port Glasgow for the Ministry of War Transport. She was bombed and sunk in St Georges Channel on 13 March 1941 on the return leg of her maiden voyage.

Description

The ship was propelled by a triple expansion steam engine.The engine was built by Rankine & Blackmore, Greenock. It drove a single screw propeller.

History
The ship was built as yard number 939 by Lithgows, Port Glasgow for the Ministry of War Transport. She was launched on 2 September 1940 and completed on December. Empire Frost was allocated the United Kingdom Official Number 166992. Her port of registry was Greenock and she was operated under the management of G Heyn & Sons Ltd, Greenock.

Empire Frost departed from the Clyde on 11 January 1941 on her maiden voyage. She joined Convoy OB 272, which had departed from Liverpool the previous day and dispersed at sea on 14 January. Her destination was Baltimore, Maryland, United States where she arrived on 30 January. She loaded a cargo of wheat, and sailed on 11 February for Halifax, Nova Scotia, Canada, arriving on 16 February. She departed on 18 February with Convoy SC 23, which was bound for Loch Ewe.

On 12 March 1941, Empire Frost was bombed whilst in St Georges Channel. Severely damaged, she was taken in tow the next day by the Dutch tug Seine, but was bombed and sunk by Heinkel He 111 aircraft of Kampfgeschwader 27, with the loss of six of her crew. Those lost on Empire Frost are commemorated on the Tower Hill Memorial in London.

References

1940 ships
Ships built in Glasgow
Empire ships
Ministry of War Transport ships
Steamships of the United Kingdom
Maritime incidents in March 1941
Cargo ships sunk by aircraft
World War II shipwrecks in the Atlantic Ocean
Ships sunk by German aircraft